Emil Regnard (8 September 1897 – 1962) was an Austrian footballer. He played in six matches for the Austria national football team from 1923 to 1927.

References

External links
 

1897 births
1962 deaths
Austrian footballers
Austria international footballers
Place of birth missing
Association footballers not categorized by position